Roskilde Festival 2010 was held from 1 to 4 July, with warmup from 26 June. For the 2010 edition of Roskilde Festival, they decided to close down the Astoria stage.

New features
 A Tuborg label-shaped, CO2-neutral swimming pool was situated at the festival's Culture Zone as a wonderland for Roskilde Festival's water-loving audience. Everyone must provide an energy ratio on custom-built fitness bicycles in order to get access to the pool area.
 Using the slogan Cut the Crap, Roskilde Festival has encouraged the guests to clean up after themselves and take care of the environment. The collection of garbage at the campsite is a part of the climate and environmental focus of Roskilde Festival 2010. A part of the initiative is also this year's refund system on pavilions. The guests have deposited over EUR 67,000 in refund on pavilions, and already by Sunday morning the first pavilions were turned in and the refund paid out. Even so, if anyone leaves their pavilion behind, Roskilde Festival will donate all materials that are left behind and covered by the refund agreement to the Danish humanitarian organization DanChurchAid.

Line up

Band list

Afenginn (DK)
Matias Aguayo (CHL)
Alice in Chains (US)
Analog Africa Soundsystem (DE)
Arriba La Cumbria (UK)
The Asteroids Galaxy Tour (DK)
Bad Lieutenant (UK)
Baron Criminel (DK)
Beach House (US)
The Bear Quartet (S)
Beat Torrent (FR)
Blackie and the Rodeo Kings (CAN)
Boban i Marko Markovic Orkestar (SER)
Bonaparte (DE)
Brother Ali (US)
Canteca De Macao (E)
Casiokids (N)
CéU (BRA)
Chimes & Bells (DK)
Choc Quib Town (COL)
Circle (FIN)
Converge (US)
C.V. Jørgensen (DK)
Daara J Family (SEN)
Dala Dala (DE)
Den Sorte Skole (DK)
Die Antwoord (ZA)
Dirty Projectors (US)
Dizzy Mizz Lizzy (DK)
Dulsori (KOR)
Efterklang (DK)
Eim Ick (DK)
Electrojuice (DK)
Fallulah (DK)
The Floor Is Made Of Lava (DK)
Florence + The Machine (UK)
FM Belfast (ISL)
Fontän (S)
Gallows (UK)
Ghost Society (DK)
Gorillaz (UK)
Health (US)
Iceage (DK)
Ikonika vs. Cooly G (UK)
Japandroids (CAN)
Joensuu 1685 (FIN)
Jack Johnson (US)
The Kandidate (DK)
Kandy Kolored Tangerine (DK)
Kasabian (UK)
Kashmir (DK)
Kasper Spez (DK)
Khal Allan (DK)
Kill Screen Music (DK)
Killswitch Engage (US)
Kings of Convenience (N)
The Kissaway Trail (DK)
Bassekou Kouyate & Ngoni Ba (MALI)
Kråkesølv (N)
LCD Soundsystem (US)
Lindstrøm & Christabelle (N)
Local Natives (US)
Freja Loeb (DK)
Julian Marley (JAM)
Aurelio Martinez (HND)
Mexican Institute of Sound (MEX)
Miike Snow (S)
Moderat (DE)
Motörhead (UK)
Muse (UK)
My Evil Twin (DK)
The National (US)
Nedry (UK)
Nephew (DK)
New Keepers of the Water Towers (S)
Night Fever (DK)
Nile (US)
John Olav Nilsen & Gjengen (NOR)
Nisennenmondai (SOL)
NOFX (US)
Van Dyke Parks (US)
Orchestre Poly Rythmo de Cotonou (BEN)
Paramore (US)
Pavement (US)
Pendulum (AUS)
Gilles Peterson & Roberto Fonseca present Havana Cultura (CUB/UK)
Porcupine Tree (UK)
The Prodigy (UK)
Prince (US)
Prins Thomas (N)
Rising (DK)
Robyn (S)
Rootz Underground (COL)
Roska (UK)
Rubik (FIN)
The Rumour Said Fire (DK)
Schlachthofbronx (DE)
Serena-Maneesh (NOR)
Shantel & Bucovina Club Orkestar (DE)
Sick of It All (US)
Sleep Party People (DK)
Patti Smith and Band (US)
Sólstafir (ISL)
Speed Caravan (ALG/FR)
Staff Benda Bilili (CD)
Susanne Sundfør (N)
Tim Sweeney (US)
Systema Solar (COL)
T.O.K. (JAM)
Tech N9ne (US)
Teddybears (S)
The Temper Trap (AUS)
Tinariwen (MALI)
Titus Andronicus (US)
Thee Attacks (DK)
Them Crooked Vultures (US)
DJ Umb (UK)
Valient Thorr (US)
Vampire Weekend (US)
When Saints Go Machine (DK)
Wild Beasts (UK)
Wooden Shjips (US)

References

Roskilde Festival by year
2010 in Danish music
2010 music festivals